Arthur Loudell (April 10, 1882 – February 19, 1961) was a pitcher in Major League Baseball. He played for the Detroit Tigers in 1910.

He was born April 10, 1882, in Latham, Missouri, to Mortiz Laudel and Emma Christiane Loesch Laudel, the youngest of their 12 children. During his baseball career, he changed the spelling of his last name to Loudell.  On May 20, 1914, he married Flora Jane Hunter in Allen County, Indiana.

He died February 19, 1961, in Kansas City, Kansas and is interred at Mount Moriah Cemetery in Kansas City, Kansas.

References

External links

1882 births
1961 deaths
Major League Baseball pitchers
Detroit Tigers players
Baseball players from Missouri
Dallas Giants players
Waco Navigators players
Minneapolis Millers (baseball) players
Fort Wayne Railroaders players